Quiche Lorraine is a French tart with a filling made of cream, eggs, and bacon or ham, in an open pastry case. It was little known outside the French region of Lorraine until the mid-20th century. As its popularity spread, nationally and internationally, the addition of cheese became commonplace, although it was criticised as inauthentic. The dish may be served hot, warm or cold.

History

According to Larousse Gastronomique, quiches (sometimes spelled kiches) originated in the eastern French region Lorraine. The name may derive from the German kuchen, a term used for similar dishes. There are many varieties of quiche, and Larousse comments that every region of Alsace and Lorraine has its own and maintains it is the only authentic version of the dish. Originally a quiche Lorraine was baked with a bread-dough case similar to that now used for pissaladières and pizzas, but in modern versions shortcrust or puff pastry is generally used. The dish dates back to the 16th century, but until well into the 20th century it was little known outside its region of origin, and was as seldom seen in Paris as in foreign countries.

Ingredients

The classic ingredients for the filling are eggs, thick cream, and ham or bacon (in strips or lardons), made into a savoury custard. Elizabeth David in her French Provincial Cooking (1960) and Simone Beck, Louisette Bertholle and Julia Child in their Mastering the Art of French Cooking (1961) excluded cheese from their recipes for quiche Lorraine, and David in particular was scornful of cooks and manufacturers who added it. She considered they did so for reasons of cost and convenience rather than taste: a classic quiche Lorraine, with only a cream, egg and bacon filling, is "quite tricky to get right".

David placed the responsibility for the inauthentic addition of cheese with Parisian chefs. In 1870 Jules Gouffé introduced a version to which he added Parmesan, and in 1903 Auguste Escoffier recommended lining the pastry case with bacon and strips of Gruyère before adding the cream and egg mixture. Attempts were made to restore the simplicity of the original dish: in 1901 Le Figaro printed a recipe that excluded not only cheese but also bacon, and in 1904 André Theuriet and a fellow native of Lorraine, Edmond Richardin, published another recipe that included neither bacon nor cheese, but in 1932 Marcel Boulestin, a highly influential restaurateur and writer, specified the addition of grated Gruyère, and by the 1950s the use of cheese had become commonplace as the popularity of quiche Lorraine grew. David cited a London cookery school where the students were taught to use evaporated milk and processed Cheddar for their fillings. La Mère Brazier's standard recipe for the dish excluded cheese, but she thought variations permissible, "replac[ing] the lardons and the ham with a layer of sliced Roquefort ... or with thin slices of goose or duck liver and fresh truffle".

Among some recent versions of the dish, Anne-Sophie Pic's adds Comté, and Delia Smith's adds both Cheddar and Parmesan. No cheese is used in the versions by Lindsey Bareham, Felicity Cloake, Alain Ducasse, Simon Hopkinson, Thomas Keller and Dan Lepard. Ready-made quiches Lorraines sold in supermarkets in France, Britain and the US typically contain cheese – usually Emmental or similar, although British versions often contain Cheddar.

The dish may be served hot, warm or cold.

Notes, references and sources

Notes

References

Sources

External links

Savoury pies
French cuisine
Egg dishes